Jezfatan-e Sofla (also Romanized as Jezfaţan-e Soflá) is a village in Ganjabad Rural District, Esmaili District, Anbarabad County, Kerman Province, Iran. At the 2006 census, its population was 130, in 21 families.

References 

Populated places in Anbarabad County